Ronnie Bremer (born 14 October 1978) is a Danish racecar driver who has driven in the Champ Car World Series.

Bremer won three consecutive Danish Formula A karting championships from 1998 to 2000, before racing in British Formula Ford and Formula 3.  In 2003, he shifted his career to America, running in the Toyota Atlantic Series, where he notched one win and finished fifth in the Championship.

In a somewhat surprising move, the HVM team signed Bremer, still a relative unknown, to a Champ Car ride for 2005.  The rookie was impressive in his first five starts, but he was dropped by HVM for financial reasons.  However, HVM soon announced that regardless, they had already signed Bremer for 2006.  After missing one race, Bremer joined the Dale Coyne Racing team to finish the 2005 season. Ronnie claimed that he would be returning to HVM, but this proved not to be the case. The team instead signed Dan Clarke and Nelson Philippe. Bremer returned to Atlantics for the last few races of the 2006 season driving for Polestar Racing Group. He tested for RuSport in the hope of replacing the injured Cristiano da Matta for the final 2 races of 2006, but the drive went to Ryan Briscoe.

He returned to Polestar in 2007 for a partial season of Atlantics racing. After Polestar suspended operations, he announced a move to Brooks Associates racing, where he began starting with the race at San Jose.

Ronnie Bremer has the record of most winning Danish racecar driver

Bremer now drives for Team Stevenson Motorsport in the Rolex Grand Am (2011)

Racing record
2011 > Present -
GRAND-AM Rolex Sports Car Series(Stevenson Motorsports)
Daytona Rolex 24 and
Jet Black Racing — Dubai 24

2010
GRAND-AM Rolex Series (Stevenson Motorsports)
Team Rhino’s Leipert ADAC GT Masters

2009
Peugeot Spider Cup, Denmark Champion
Wins 14 of 14 races, Record in Danish racing history.
Team Rhino’s Leipert ADAC GT Masters

Peugeot Spider International Finales (SPA Belgium) Podium
FIA Copenhagen Historic Grand Prix Royal Pro/Am Champion

2008
Danish Touring Car (KP Racing Mercedes)
Mini Le Mans i Peugeot 207 Spider

2007
ChampCar Atlantic Series

2006
Danish Touring Car

2005
ChampCar World Series

2004
Toyota ChampCar Atlantic Series Rookie of the year

2003
Petit Le Mans Danish Touring Car
Championship Champion
British Formula 3

2002
Danish Touring Car
British Formula 3

2001
Danish Championship for Teams (Karting) – Champion
Formula Ford Festival Vice Champion
British Formula Ford

2000
Yokohama Cup – Winner
Danish Formula A Championship – Champion
Italian Formula A Championship Winner
Nordic Championship, Vice Champion

1999
Danish Formula A Championship – Champion
Formula Super A World Championship

1998
Danish Championship Formula A – Champion
Formula A European Championship
Formula A World Championship

1997
Danish Formula A Championship
Challenge Race – Champion
McDonald's Grand Final – Champion
Viking Trophy — Vice Champion
Nordic Championship ICA — Vice Champion

1996 (Karting)
Danish Championship
German Winter Cup Championship

1995 (Karting)
Regional Championship – Champion
Danish Championship — Vice Champion

1990 – 1994 (Karting):
Danish Championship Formula Junior (1990) Champion

American open–wheel racing results
(key)

Atlantic Championship

Champ Car

External links
Official Website

1978 births
Living people
Danish racing drivers
Champ Car drivers
Atlantic Championship drivers
British Formula Three Championship drivers
Danish Touring Car Championship drivers
Formula Ford drivers
24 Hours of Daytona drivers
Rolex Sports Car Series drivers
ADAC GT Masters drivers
Carlin racing drivers
Manor Motorsport drivers
HVM Racing drivers
Dale Coyne Racing drivers